is a passenger railway station located in the city of Mima, Tokushima Prefecture, Japan. It is operated by JR Shikoku and has the station number "B16".

Lines
Besides local trains, the Tsurugisan limited express service also stops at Anabuki.

Layout
The station consists of an island platform serving 2 tracks with sidings and passing loops branching off the tracks on either side. The station building is a large wooden structure with a tiled roof and houses a shop, waiting room, and a JR ticket window (with a Midori no Madoguchi facility). Some parking is available at the station. Access to the island platform is by means of a pedestrian level crossing.

Platforms

Adjacent stations

History
With the privatization of Japanese National Railways (JNR), the successor to JGR, on 1 April 1987, Anabuki came under the control of JR Shikoku. On 1 June 1988, the line was renamed the Tokushima Line.

Passenger statistics
In fiscal 2018, the station was used by an average of 1452 passengers dailyy

Surrounding area
Tokushima Prefectural Anabuki High School
Mima City Hall

See also
 List of Railway Stations in Japan

References

External links

 JR Shikoku official homepage

Railway stations in Tokushima Prefecture
Railway stations in Japan opened in 1914
Mima, Tokushima